Massillon Township is one of seventeen townships in Cedar County, Iowa, USA.  As of the 2000 census, its population was 330.

Geography
According to the USGS, it contains three cemeteries: Brink, Center and Massillon. The township also contains the unincorporated settlement of Massillon, Iowa for which it is named.

References

External links
 US-Counties.com
 City-Data.com

Townships in Cedar County, Iowa
Townships in Iowa